The 2016 CERH European Championship was the 52nd edition of the CERH European Roller Hockey Championship, a biennial tournament for men's national roller hockey teams of Europe organised by CERH, which took place between 11 and 16 July in Oliveira de Azeméis, Portugal.

Eight teams competed in the tournament to determine the successor of Italy, who won the previous edition. In the final, hosts Portugal defeated the defending champions Italy 6–2 to secure a record-breaking 21st title, their first since 1998, when they beat Spain in the final.

Teams
The following eight teams competed at the tournament:

Venue
All the games of the tournament were played in Oliveira de Azeméis, Portugal.

Squads

Each team submitted a squad of 10 players, including 2 goalkeepers.

Match officials
The referee teams were announced on 5 February 2016. Each team has two referees.

Draw
The 8 teams were divided in two groups, each group with 4 teams. The draw resulted in the following groups:

Group stage
All teams advanced to the quarter-finals.

Tiebreakers
The teams were ranked according to points (3 points for a win, 1 point for a draw, 0 points for a loss). If two or more teams were equal on points on completion of the group matches, the following tie-breaking criteria were applied, in the order given, to determine the rankings:
Higher number of points obtained in the group matches played among the teams in question;
Superior goal difference resulting from the group matches played among the teams in question;
Superior goal difference in all group matches;
Superior ratio of goals in all group matches, resulting from the number of goals scored divided by the number of goals conceded;
Higher number of goals scored in all group matches;
If only two teams had the same number of points, and they were tied according to criteria 1 to 5 after having met in the last round of the group stage, their rankings were determined by a direct free kick shoot-out (not used if more than two teams had the same number of points, or if their rankings were not relevant for qualification for the next stage).

All times are Portugal Summer Time (UTC+01:00).

Group A

Group B

Knockout stage

Quarterfinals

Fifth to eighth place classification

Fifth to eighth place semi-finals

Seventh place match

Fifth place match

Semi-finals

Third place match

Final

Final ranking

External links
 CERH official calendar for the 2015–16 season
 Official website 
 CERH website

References

International roller hockey competitions hosted by Portugal
2016 in Portuguese sport
CERH European Roller Hockey Championship
2016 in roller hockey